Sugar Camp Lake is a freshwater lake located in Sugar Camp, Oneida County, Wisconsin, United States.  The town of Sugar Camp has a public beach on this lake off of Wisconsin Highway 17.

References

External links
Sugar Camp Lake at Lake-Link.com

Lakes of Oneida County, Wisconsin